(initials of Video & Audio Project) is a Japanese entertainment company, headquartered in Chiyoda, Tokyo. It is a subsidiary of Nippon Television Holdings, Inc.

Artists
 Kikuchi Momoko
 Sugiyama Kiyotaka & Omega Tribe
 Carlos Toshiki & Omega Tribe
 1986 Omega Tribe
 Coldrain (2008–2017)
 Concerto Moon
 Eastern Youth
 Edge of Spirit
 Fear, and Loathing in Las Vegas (2010–2017)
 Galneryus
 Girls on the Run
 Aya Hisakawa
 Nightmare (Japanese band) (2006–2011)
 Nobuyuki Hiyama
 Last Alliance
 Maximum the Hormone (2002–2018)
 NoisyCell
 Hajime Mizoguchi
 Toshiyuki Morikawa
 Yuji Ohno
 Ogre You Asshole
 Pay Money to My Pain
 Saber Tiger
 Momoko Sakura
 Sendai Kamotsu
 S.E.S.
 Yuri Shiratori
 Suzume
 White Ash
 Zwei (2004–2007)

Japanese television, drama, and anime on DVD/video
 Akagi
 Bagi, the Monster of Mighty Nature (produced for Nippon TV)
 Berserk
 Death Note
 Dōbutsu no Mori
 Elfen Lied (AT-X)
 Future GPX Cyber Formula
 Hajime no Ippo
 Hunter × Hunter (2011 series)
 Kaiba
 Kaiji
 Kōryū no Mimi
 Let's Go! Anpanman
 Lupin the Third
 Maho no Tenshi Creamy Mami
 Mamawa Shogaku Yonensei
 Master Keaton
 Mirmo! (TV Tokyo)
 Monkey
 Monster
 My Love Story!!
 Nana
 Neuro: Supernatural Detective
 Red Baron (1994-95 VHS release only; recent Blu-Ray releases were licensed to Warner Home Entertainment)
 Saint Seiya: The Lost Canvas
 Stairway to Heaven (made by Yomiuri TV)
 Super Mario Bros.: The Great Mission to Rescue Princess Peach!
 Tenchi Muyo! (and Tenchi Muyo! in OVA of Japanese television)
 Urahara
 The Water Margin
 Winter Sonata (NHK in licensed by KBS)

Core members

Broadcaster of Nippon News Network and Nippon Television Network System

Nippon Television Network Business Company

Yomiuri Shimbun Partnership Company
 Radio Kansai

Video games

See also

 Toy's Factory (a spin-off company from VAP)

References

External links
 

Anime companies
Entertainment companies established in 1981
Entertainment companies of Japan
IFPI members
Japanese companies established in 1981
Japanese record labels
Mass media companies based in Tokyo
Mitsubishi companies
Nippon TV